is a passenger railway station located in the city of Higashimatsuyama, Saitama, Japan, operated by the private railway operator Tōbu Railway.

Lines
Express, Semi express, and Local services stop at this station. During the daytime, the station is served by six trains per hour in each direction.

Station layout
The station consists of an island platform serving two tracks, with the station building located above the platforms.

Platforms

Facilities and accessibility
A waiting room is provided on the platform. Universal access toilets are located in the station building. Escalators and lifts are provided in addition to steps to the station and platforms.

Adjacent stations

History
The station opened on 1 October 1923.

From 17 March 2012, station numbering was introduced on the Tōbu Tōjō Line, with Takasaka Station becoming "TJ-28".

Passenger statistics
In fiscal 2019, the station was used by an average of 24,438 passengers daily.

Surrounding area

A large out-of-town shopping mall, Peony Walk, is located approximately 1 km from Takasaka Station.

 Takasaka New Town
 Tokigawa River
 Tokigawa Riverside Park

See also
 List of railway stations in Japan

References

External links

 Tobu station information 

Railway stations in Saitama Prefecture
Stations of Tobu Railway
Tobu Tojo Main Line
Railway stations in Japan opened in 1923
Higashimatsuyama, Saitama